Derek Leslie Quinnell (born 22 May 1949 in Llanelli, Carmarthenshire) is a former Welsh rugby union player. He played as a lock-forward and as a number eight. He was capped for Wales youth 1967/8 season.

Club career
Educated at Coleshill Secondary Modern School, Llanelli, Derek Quinnell first played for Llanelli RFC in 1967 and made his international debut for Wales against France in 1972. He captained Llanelli in 1979–80 and went on three British and Irish Lions tours.

International career
He earned 23 caps for Wales, from 1972 to 1980, scoring 1 try, 4 points on aggregate. He played at the Five Nations Championship in 1972, 1973, 1974, 1975, 1977, 1978 and 1979. He was a member of the winning squad in 1973 (shared), 1975, 1978 and 1979.

He was the only player in the Lions squad not to have been capped by his country when he went on the tour to New Zealand in 1971, playing in one test. He went to New Zealand again in 1977, playing in two tests, and finally to South Africa in 1980, again playing in two tests.

Post-player career
Quinnell is currently the President of Llanelli F.C.

Family
Remarkably, his three sons, Scott, Craig and Gavin went on to play top-flight professional rugby, with Craig winning caps for Wales in rugby union and Scott earning Wales caps in both union and league.

Derek's youngest son, Gavin, played professionally for the Magners League side Scarlets before an injury suffered in an October 2010 match between Llanelli RFC and Cross Keys cost him the sight in his left eye.

References

External links
archive of profile at Wales Rugby Union

1949 births
Living people
Barbarian F.C. players
British & Irish Lions rugby union players from Wales
Llanelli RFC players
Rugby union locks
Rugby union number eights
Rugby union players from Llanelli
Wales international rugby union players
Welsh rugby union players